Stabat Mater is the sixth full-length album by Stefano Lentini.  It was released on October 8, 2013. The single 'Stabat Mater' is a part of the soundtrack of Wong Kar Wai's The Grandmaster, 2014 Oscar Nominee. In an interview with the Pitchfork website, Lentini said: Sacred music is generally only referred to music based on religious texts. I think this is wrong. Any kind of music able to convey some Truth about existence should be regarded as “sacred”. It is neither a matter of sound nor of musical instrument. It is not a genre, but an attitude: whether it is symphonic or indie music, if there is some inner truth in it, a profound expressive intensity, then there’s sacredness. Whatever is human is necessarily sacred, because humanity always deserves to be respected and honoured. Before being “sacred” for its text, my Stabat Mater is mundanely sacred for the emotions it hopefully arouses.

Track listing 
All songs written by Stefano Lentini
 "Stabat Mater" – 3:02
 "Eight Sisters" – 6:16
 "Alma" – 2:31
 "Alma - Coda" – 3:10
 "Viele Kleine" – 5:02
 "Ave Maria" – 3:37
 "Estrella Apagada" – 5:35
 "Metamorphoseon" – 3:01
 "Metamorphosis Outro" – 1:25
 "Stabat Mater (Piano Suite)" – 6:24

Personnel
 The City of Rome Contemporary Music Ensemble - orchestra
 Sandra Pastrana - soprano
 Stefano Lentini - piano, guitar, pipa
 Eunice Cangianiello - violin
 Luca Peverinii - cello
 Rossano Baldini - piano
 Marco Gonella - piano
 Paolo Innarella - bansuri
 Pasquale Laino - sax
 Antonella Capurso - choir
 Antonella - choir
 Adriano Caroletti - choir
 Giuseppe Nicodemo - choir
 Pierpaolo Giordano - choir
 Lur Mahazar - choir

References

2013 albums
Milan Records albums
Stefano Lentini albums